Jackson County is located in the Arkansas Delta in the U.S. state of Arkansas. The county is named for Andrew Jackson, a national hero during the War of 1812. By the county's formation in 1829, Jackson had become the seventh President of the United States. Jackson County is home to seven incorporated towns and four incorporated cities, including Newport, the largest city and county seat. The county is also the site of numerous unincorporated communities and ghost towns. Occupying , Jackson County is the 41st largest county of the 75 in Arkansas. As of the 2020 Census, the county's population was 16,755. Based on population, the county is the 44th-largest county in Arkansas. Although terrain rises in the west, most of Jackson County is within the Arkansas Delta, characterized by largely flat terrain with fertile soils. Historically covered in forest, bayous and swamps, the area was cleared for agriculture by early settlers. It is drained by the White River.

Although no Interstate highways are located in Jackson County, two United States highways (U.S. Route 67 (US 67) and US 167) and fifteen Arkansas state highways run in the county. A Union Pacific Railroad line also crosses the county.

Geography

Major highways

 Future Interstate 57
 U.S. Highway 67
 U.S. Highway 167
 Highway 14
 Highway 17
 Highway 18
 Highway 18 Spur
 Highway 33
 Highway 37
 Highway 42
 Highway 69
 Highway 69 Spur
 Highway 87
 Highway 145
 Highway 157
 Highway 224
 Highway 226
 Highway 367
 Highway 384
 Airport Highway 980

Adjacent counties
Lawrence County (north)
Craighead County (northeast)
Poinsett County (east)
Cross County (southeast)
Woodruff County (south)
White County (southwest)
Independence County (west)

National protected area
 Cache River National Wildlife Refuge (part)

Demographics

2020 census

As of the 2020 United States census, there were 16,755 people, 6,137 households, and 3,758 families residing in the county.

2000 census
As of the 2000 census, there were 18,418 people, 6,971 households, and 4,830 families residing in the county.  The population density was 29 people per square mile (11/km2).  There were 7,956 housing units at an average density of 13 per square mile (5/km2).  The racial makeup of the county was 80.57% White, 17.56% Black or African American, 0.33% Native American, 0.18% Asian, 0.01% Pacific Islander, 0.40% from other races, and 0.95% from two or more races.  1.27% of the population were Hispanic or Latino of any race.

There were 6,971 households, out of which 27.70% had children under the age of 18 living with them, 52.20% were married couples living together, 13.10% had a female householder with no husband present, and 30.70% were non-families. 27.90% of all households were made up of individuals, and 14.40% had someone living alone who was 65 years of age or older.  The average household size was 2.40 and the average family size was 2.92.

In the county, the population was spread out, with 22.20% under the age of 18, 11.50% from 18 to 24, 26.00% from 25 to 44, 23.80% from 45 to 64, and 16.50% who were 65 years of age or older.  The median age was 38 years. For every 100 females there were 91.20 males.  For every 100 females age 18 and over, there were 87.80 males.

The median income for a household in the county was $25,081, and the median income for a family was $32,661. Males had a median income of $26,744 versus $17,830 for females. The per capita income for the county was $14,564.  About 13.20% of families and 17.40% of the population were below the poverty line, including 25.00% of those under age 18 and 16.70% of those age 65 or over.

Government and infrastructure
The prison houses the state's death row for women. The Jackson County Sheriff's Office is the primary county-wide law enforcement agency.

Politics

Communities

Cities
 Campbell Station
 Diaz
 Grubbs
 Newport (county seat)
 Swifton
 Tuckerman

Towns
 Amagon
 Beedeville
 Jacksonport
 Tupelo
 Weldon

Unincorporated communities
 Balch
 Centerville
 Denmark
 Heffington
 Kenyon
 Macks
 Midway
 Olyphant
 Possum Grape

Ghost towns
 Colerain
 Estico
 Mt. Pinson
 Myrickville
 Sneed

Townships

 Barren
 Bateman (contains part of Newport)
 Bird (contains most of Tuckerman)
 Breckinridge (contains Tupelo and Weldon)
 Bryan
 Cache
 Cow Lake (contains Beedeville)
 Glaize
 Glass (contains Swifton)
 Grubbs (contains Grubbs)
 Jefferson (contains Campbell Station and Jacksonport, part of Diaz and Tuckerman)
 Richwoods (contains Amagon)
 Union (contains most of Diaz and Newport)
 Village (contains part of Diaz and Newport)

Source:

Government and politics
Jackson County is represented in the Arkansas State Senate by the Republican Ronald R. Caldwell, a real estate businessman from Wynne in Cross County.

See also

 List of lakes in Jackson County, Arkansas
 National Register of Historic Places listings in Jackson County, Arkansas

References

External links
Jackson County official website

 
1829 establishments in Arkansas Territory
Populated places established in 1829